The Heinrich Schliemann Museum is a cultural site in Ankershagen, in Mecklenburg-Vorpommern, Germany. It is a museum about the life and work of the businessman and amateur archaeologist Heinrich Schliemann (1822–1890), in the building, formerly a rectory, where Schliemann spent his childhood years.

History
Heinrich Schliemann was born in Neubukow in 1822. His father was a pastor; the family moved to this 18th-century rectory in 1823. He lived here until 1832, a year after the death of his mother, when he moved to Kalkhorst to live with his father's brother. From 1834 he attended school in Neustrelitz.

Exhibition
The museum was opened in 1980.

There is a permanent exhibition, in ten themed rooms, about his childhood, the subsequent years including periods as a businessman in Russia and banker in America, and his work as an amateur archaeologist, discovering the Mycenaean culture and excavating the site of Troy. Temporary exhibitions, about Schliemann or a different topic, are held on the attic floor.

Research
The museum has been established as a centre for Schliemann research. Its archive includes Schliemann's original letters, and copies of his 18 excavation diaries. The Heinrich-Schliemann-Gesellschaft (Heinrich Schliemann Society), founded in 1991, gives regular lectures about his life and work.

References

Biographical museums in Germany
Archaeological museums in Germany
Museums in Mecklenburg-Western Pomerania